Francisco Adriano da Silva Rodrigues, commonly known as Adriano (born October 14, 1985), is a Brazilian football forward who currently plays for União Recreativa dos Trabalhadores.

Career
He played two Copa do Brasil games in 2006 defending América-MG. He has also played for Cruzeiro, Ipatinga and Nacional da Madeira, and was transferred to Boavista in 2008.

References

Living people
1985 births
Brazilian footballers
Footballers from Belo Horizonte
Cruzeiro Esporte Clube players
Ipatinga Futebol Clube players
América Futebol Clube (MG) players
C.D. Nacional players
Boavista F.C. players
Brazilian expatriate footballers
Expatriate footballers in Portugal
Association football forwards